James and Jim Fallon may refer to:

James Fallon (Australian politician) (1823–1886), Australian politician, vigneron, and wine merchant
James H. Fallon (born 1947),  American neuroscientist.
Jim Fallon (footballer) (born 1950), Scottish association football player and manager
Jim Fallon (rugby) (born 1965), English rugby union and rugby league footballer
Jimmy Fallon (born 1974), American comedian and talk show host
Jim Fallon, character in the 1952 film The Big Trees, played by Kirk Douglas

See also
James Fallon High School, Albury, New South Wales, Australia